Search engine optimization (SEO) is the process of improving the quality and quantity of website traffic to a website or a web page from search engines. SEO targets unpaid traffic (known as "natural" or "organic" results) rather than direct traffic or paid traffic. Unpaid traffic may originate from different kinds of searches, including image search, video search, academic search, news search, and industry-specific vertical search engines. 

As an Internet marketing strategy, SEO considers how search engines work, the computer-programmed algorithms that dictate search engine behavior, what people search for, the actual search terms or keywords typed into search engines, and which search engines are preferred by their targeted audience. SEO is performed because a website will receive more visitors from a search engine when websites rank higher on the search engine results page (SERP). These visitors can then potentially be converted into customers.

History 
Webmasters and content providers began optimizing websites for search engines in the mid-1990s, as the first search engines were cataloging the early Web. Initially, all webmasters only needed to submit the address of a page, or URL, to the various engines, which would send a web crawler to crawl that page, extract links to other pages from it, and return information found on the page to be indexed. The process involves a search engine spider downloading a page and storing it on the search engine's own server. A second program, known as an indexer, extracts information about the page, such as the words it contains, where they are located, and any weight for specific words, as well as all links the page contains. All of this information is then placed into a scheduler for crawling at a later date.

Website owners recognized the value of a high ranking and visibility in search engine results, creating an opportunity for both white hat and black hat SEO practitioners. According to industry analyst Danny Sullivan, the phrase "search engine optimization" probably came into use in 1997. Sullivan credits Bruce Clay as one of the first people to popularize the term.

Early versions of search algorithms relied on webmaster-provided information such as the keyword meta tag or index files in engines like ALIWEB. Meta tags provide a guide to each page's content. Using metadata to index pages was found to be less than reliable, however, because the webmaster's choice of keywords in the meta tag could potentially be an inaccurate representation of the site's actual content. Flawed data in meta tags, such as those that were not accurate, complete, or falsely attributes, created the potential for pages to be mischaracterized in irrelevant searches. Web content providers also manipulated some attributes within the HTML source of a page in an attempt to rank well in search engines. By 1997, search engine designers recognized that webmasters were making efforts to rank well in their search engine and that some webmasters were even manipulating their rankings in search results by stuffing pages with excessive or irrelevant keywords. Early search engines, such as Altavista and Infoseek, adjusted their algorithms to prevent webmasters from manipulating rankings.

By heavily relying on factors such as keyword density, which were exclusively within a webmaster's control, early search engines suffered from abuse and ranking manipulation. To provide better results to their users, search engines had to adapt to ensure their results pages showed the most relevant search results, rather than unrelated pages stuffed with numerous keywords by unscrupulous webmasters. This meant moving away from heavy reliance on term density to a more holistic process for scoring semantic signals. Since the success and popularity of a search engine are determined by its ability to produce the most relevant results to any given search, poor quality or irrelevant search results could lead users to find other search sources. Search engines responded by developing more complex ranking algorithms, taking into account additional factors that were more difficult for webmasters to manipulate.

Companies that employ overly aggressive techniques can get their client websites banned from the search results. In 2005, the Wall Street Journal reported on a company, Traffic Power, which allegedly used high-risk techniques and failed to disclose those risks to its clients. Wired magazine reported that the same company sued blogger and SEO Aaron Wall for writing about the ban. Google's Matt Cutts later confirmed that Google did in fact ban Traffic Power and some of its clients.

Some search engines have also reached out to the SEO industry and are frequent sponsors and guests at SEO conferences, webchats, and seminars. Major search engines provide information and guidelines to help with website optimization. Google has a Sitemaps program to help webmasters learn if Google is having any problems indexing their website and also provides data on Google traffic to the website. Bing Webmaster Tools provides a way for webmasters to submit a sitemap and web feeds, allows users to determine the "crawl rate," and track the web pages index status.

In 2015, it was reported that Google was developing and promoting mobile search as a key feature within future products. In response, many brands began to take a different approach to their Internet marketing strategies.

Relationship with Google
In 1998, two graduate students at Stanford University, Larry Page and Sergey Brin, developed "Backrub," a search engine that relied on a mathematical algorithm to rate the prominence of web pages. The number calculated by the algorithm, PageRank, is a function of the quantity and strength of inbound links. PageRank estimates the likelihood that a given page will be reached by a web user who randomly surfs the web and follows links from one page to another. In effect, this means that some links are stronger than others, as a higher PageRank page is more likely to be reached by the random web surfer.

Page and Brin founded Google in 1998. Google attracted a loyal following among the growing number of Internet users, who liked its simple design. Off-page factors (such as PageRank and hyperlink analysis) were considered as well as on-page factors (such as keyword frequency, meta tags, headings, links and site structure) to enable Google to avoid the kind of manipulation seen in search engines that only considered on-page factors for their rankings. Although PageRank was more difficult to game, webmasters had already developed link-building tools and schemes to influence the Inktomi search engine, and these methods proved similarly applicable to gaming PageRank. Many sites focus on exchanging, buying, and selling links, often on a massive scale. Some of these schemes, or link farms, involved the creation of thousands of sites for the sole purpose of link spamming.

By 2004, search engines had incorporated a wide range of undisclosed factors in their ranking algorithms to reduce the impact of link manipulation. In June 2007, The New York Times' Saul Hansell stated Google ranks sites using more than 200 different signals. The leading search engines, Google, Bing, and Yahoo, do not disclose the algorithms they use to rank pages. Some SEO practitioners have studied different approaches to search engine optimization and have shared their personal opinions. Patents related to search engines can provide information to better understand search engines. In 2005, Google began personalizing search results for each user. Depending on their history of previous searches, Google crafted results for logged in users.

In 2007, Google announced a campaign against paid links that transfer PageRank. On June 15, 2009, Google disclosed that they had taken measures to mitigate the effects of PageRank sculpting by use of the nofollow attribute on links. Matt Cutts, a well-known software engineer at Google, announced that Google Bot would no longer treat any no follow links, in the same way, to prevent SEO service providers from using nofollow for PageRank sculpting. As a result of this change, the usage of nofollow led to evaporation of PageRank. In order to avoid the above, SEO engineers developed alternative techniques that replace nofollowed tags with obfuscated JavaScript and thus permit PageRank sculpting. Additionally, several solutions have been suggested that include the usage of iframes, Flash, and JavaScript.

In December 2009, Google announced it would be using the web search history of all its users in order to populate search results. On June 8, 2010 a new web indexing system called Google Caffeine was announced. Designed to allow users to find news results, forum posts, and other content much sooner after publishing than before, Google Caffeine was a change to the way Google updated its index in order to make things show up quicker on Google than before. According to Carrie Grimes, the software engineer who announced Caffeine for Google, "Caffeine provides 50 percent fresher results for web searches than our last index..." Google Instant, real-time-search, was introduced in late 2010 in an attempt to make search results more timely and relevant. Historically site administrators have spent months or even years optimizing a website to increase search rankings. With the growth in popularity of social media sites and blogs, the leading engines made changes to their algorithms to allow fresh content to rank quickly within the search results.

In February 2011, Google announced the Panda update, which penalizes websites containing content duplicated from other websites and sources. Historically websites have copied content from one another and benefited in search engine rankings by engaging in this practice. However, Google implemented a new system that punishes sites whose content is not unique. The 2012 Google Penguin attempted to penalize websites that used manipulative techniques to improve their rankings on the search engine. Although Google Penguin has been presented as an algorithm aimed at fighting web spam, it really focuses on spammy links by gauging the quality of the sites the links are coming from. The 2013 Google Hummingbird update featured an algorithm change designed to improve Google's natural language processing and semantic understanding of web pages. Hummingbird's language processing system falls under the newly recognized term of "conversational search," where the system pays more attention to each word in the query in order to better match the pages to the meaning of the query rather than a few words. With regards to the changes made to search engine optimization, for content publishers and writers, Hummingbird is intended to resolve issues by getting rid of irrelevant content and spam, allowing Google to produce high-quality content and rely on them to be 'trusted' authors.

In October 2019, Google announced they would start applying BERT models for English language search queries in the US. Bidirectional Encoder Representations from Transformers (BERT) was another attempt by Google to improve their natural language processing, but this time in order to better understand the search queries of their users. In terms of search engine optimization, BERT intended to connect users more easily to relevant content and increase the quality of traffic coming to websites that are ranking in the Search Engine Results Page.

Methods

Getting indexed 

The leading search engines, such as Google, Bing, and Yahoo!, use crawlers to find pages for their algorithmic search results. Pages that are linked from other search engine-indexed pages do not need to be submitted because they are found automatically. The Yahoo! Directory and DMOZ, two major directories which closed in 2014 and 2017 respectively, both required manual submission and human editorial review. Google offers Google Search Console, for which an XML Sitemap feed can be created and submitted for free to ensure that all pages are found, especially pages that are not discoverable by automatically following links in addition to their URL submission console. Yahoo! formerly operated a paid submission service that guaranteed to crawl for a cost per click; however, this practice was discontinued in 2009.

Search engine crawlers may look at a number of different factors when crawling a site. Not every page is indexed by search engines. The distance of pages from the root directory of a site may also be a factor in whether or not pages get crawled.

Today, most people are searching on Google using a mobile device. In November 2016, Google announced a major change to the way crawling websites and started to make their index mobile-first, which means the mobile version of a given website becomes the starting point for what Google includes in their index. In May 2019, Google updated the rendering engine of their crawler to be the latest version of Chromium (74 at the time of the announcement).  Google indicated that they would regularly update the Chromium rendering engine to the latest version.  In December 2019, Google began updating the User-Agent string of their crawler to reflect the latest Chrome version used by their rendering service.  The delay was to allow webmasters time to update their code that responded to particular bot User-Agent strings.  Google ran evaluations and felt confident the impact would be minor.

Preventing crawling 

To avoid undesirable content in the search indexes, webmasters can instruct spiders not to crawl certain files or directories through the standard robots.txt file in the root directory of the domain. Additionally, a page can be explicitly excluded from a search engine's database by using a meta tag specific to robots (usually  ). When a search engine visits a site, the robots.txt located in the root directory is the first file crawled. The robots.txt file is then parsed and will instruct the robot as to which pages are not to be crawled. As a search engine crawler may keep a cached copy of this file, it may on occasion crawl pages a webmaster does not wish to crawl. Pages typically prevented from being crawled include login-specific pages such as shopping carts and user-specific content such as search results from internal searches. In March 2007, Google warned webmasters that they should prevent indexing of internal search results because those pages are considered search spam. In 2020, Google sunsetted the standard (and open-sourced their code) and now treats it as a hint not a directive. To adequately ensure that pages are not indexed, a page-level robot's meta tag should be included.

Increasing prominence 
A variety of methods can increase the prominence of a webpage within the search results. Cross linking between pages of the same website to provide more links to important pages may improve its visibility. Page design makes users trust a site and want to stay once they find it. When people bounce off a site, it counts against the site and affects its credibility.   Writing content that includes frequently searched keyword phrases so as to be relevant to a wide variety of search queries will tend to increase traffic. Updating content so as to keep search engines crawling back frequently can give additional weight to a site. Adding relevant keywords to a web page's metadata, including the title tag and meta description, will tend to improve the relevancy of a site's search listings, thus increasing traffic. URL canonicalization of web pages accessible via multiple URLs, using the canonical link element or via 301 redirects can help make sure links to different versions of the URL all count towards the page's link popularity score. These are known as incoming links, which point to the URL and can count towards the page link's popularity score, impacting the credibility of a website.

White hat versus black hat techniques 
SEO techniques can be classified into two broad categories: techniques that search engine companies recommend as part of good design ("white hat"), and those techniques of which search engines do not approve ("black hat"). Search engines attempt to minimize the effect of the latter, among them spamdexing. Industry commentators have classified these methods and the practitioners who employ them as either white hat SEO or black hat SEO. White hats tend to produce results that last a long time, whereas black hats anticipate that their sites may eventually be banned either temporarily or permanently once the search engines discover what they are doing.

An SEO technique is considered a white hat if it conforms to the search engines' guidelines and involves no deception. As the search engine guidelines are not written as a series of rules or commandments, this is an important distinction to note. White hat SEO is not just about following guidelines but is about ensuring that the content a search engine indexes and subsequently ranks is the same content a user will see. White hat advice is generally summed up as creating content for users, not for search engines, and then making that content easily accessible to the online "spider" algorithms, rather than attempting to trick the algorithm from its intended purpose. White hat SEO is in many ways similar to web development that promotes accessibility, although the two are not identical.

Black hat SEO attempts to improve rankings in ways that are disapproved of by the search engines or involve deception. One black hat technique uses hidden text, either as text colored similar to the background, in an invisible div, or positioned off-screen. Another method gives a different page depending on whether the page is being requested by a human visitor or a search engine, a technique known as cloaking. Another category sometimes used is grey hat SEO. This is in between the black hat and white hat approaches, where the methods employed avoid the site being penalized but do not act in producing the best content for users. Grey hat SEO is entirely focused on improving search engine rankings.

Search engines may penalize sites they discover using black or grey hat methods, either by reducing their rankings or eliminating their listings from their databases altogether. Such penalties can be applied either automatically by the search engines' algorithms or by a manual site review. One example was the February 2006 Google removal of both BMW Germany and Ricoh Germany for the use of deceptive practices. Both companies, however, quickly apologized, fixed the offending pages, and were restored to Google's search engine results page.

As marketing strategy 
SEO is not an appropriate strategy for every website, and other Internet marketing strategies can be more effective, such as paid advertising through pay-per-click (PPC) campaigns, depending on the site operator's goals. Search engine marketing (SEM) is the practice of designing, running, and optimizing search engine ad campaigns. Its difference from SEO is most simply depicted as the difference between paid and unpaid priority ranking in search results. SEM focuses on prominence more so than relevance; website developers should regard SEM with the utmost importance with consideration to visibility as most navigate to the primary listings of their search. A successful Internet marketing campaign may also depend upon building high-quality web pages to engage and persuade internet users, setting up analytics programs to enable site owners to measure results, and improving a site's conversion rate. In November 2015, Google released a full 160-page version of its Search Quality Rating Guidelines to the public, which revealed a shift in their focus towards "usefulness" and mobile local search. In recent years the mobile market has exploded, overtaking the use of desktops, as shown in by StatCounter in October 2016, where they analyzed 2.5 million websites and found that 51.3% of the pages were loaded by a mobile device. Google has been one of the companies that are utilizing the popularity of mobile usage by encouraging websites to use their Google Search Console, the Mobile-Friendly Test, which allows companies to measure up their website to the search engine results and determine how user-friendly their websites are. The closer the keywords are together their ranking will improve based on key terms.   

SEO may generate an adequate return on investment. However, search engines are not paid for organic search traffic, their algorithms change, and there are no guarantees of continued referrals. Due to this lack of guarantee and uncertainty, a business that relies heavily on search engine traffic can suffer major losses if the search engines stop sending visitors. Search engines can change their algorithms, impacting a website's search engine ranking, possibly resulting in a serious loss of traffic. According to Google's CEO, Eric Schmidt, in 2010, Google made over 500 algorithm changes – almost 1.5 per day. It is considered a wise business practice for website operators to liberate themselves from dependence on search engine traffic. In addition to accessibility in terms of web crawlers (addressed above), user web accessibility has become increasingly important for SEO.

International markets 
Optimization techniques are highly tuned to the dominant search engines in the target market.
The search engines' market shares vary from market to market, as does competition.
In 2003, Danny Sullivan stated that Google represented about 75% of all searches. In markets outside the United States, Google's share is often larger, and Google remains the dominant search engine worldwide as of 2007. As of 2006, Google had an 85–90% market share in Germany. While there were hundreds of SEO firms in the US at that time, there were only about five in Germany. As of June 2008, the market share of Google in the UK was close to 90% according to Hitwise. That market share is achieved in a number of countries.

As of 2009, there are only a few large markets where Google is not the leading search engine. In most cases, when Google is not leading in a given market, it is lagging behind a local player. The most notable example markets are China, Japan, South Korea, Russia, and the Czech Republic, where respectively Baidu, Yahoo! Japan, Naver, Yandex and Seznam are market leaders.

Successful search optimization for international markets may require professional translation of web pages, registration of a domain name with a top level domain in the target market, and web hosting that provides a local IP address. Otherwise, the fundamental elements of search optimization are essentially the same, regardless of language.

Legal precedents 
On October 17, 2002, SearchKing filed suit in the United States District Court, Western District of Oklahoma, against the search engine Google. SearchKing's claim was that Google's tactics to prevent spamdexing constituted a tortious interference with contractual relations.  On May 27, 2003, the court granted Google's motion to dismiss the complaint because SearchKing "failed to state a claim upon which relief may be granted."

In March 2006, KinderStart filed a lawsuit against Google over search engine rankings. KinderStart's website was removed from Google's index prior to the lawsuit, and the amount of traffic to the site dropped by 70%. On March 16, 2007, the United States District Court for the Northern District of California (San Jose Division) dismissed KinderStart's complaint without leave to amend and partially granted Google's motion for Rule 11 sanctions against KinderStart's attorney, requiring him to pay part of Google's legal expenses.

See also 

 Blog network
 Competitor backlinking
 List of search engines
 Search engine marketing
 Search neutrality, the opposite of search manipulation
 User intent
 Website promotion

References

External links 

 Webmaster Guidelines from Google
 Google Search Quality Evaluators Guidelines (PDF)
 Webmaster resources from Yahoo!
 Webmaster Guidelines from Microsoft Bing
 The Dirty Little Secrets of Search in The New York Times (February 12, 2011)

 
Digital marketing
Web analytics
Internet terminology
Online advertising
Promotion and marketing communications